The 1957 Five Nations Championship was the twenty-eighth series of the rugby union Five Nations Championship. Including the previous incarnations as the Home Nations and Five Nations, this was the sixty-third series of the northern hemisphere rugby union championship. Ten matches were played between 12 January and 23 March. It was contested by England, France, Ireland, Scotland and Wales.

England won its 15th title, winning also the Grand Slam, the Triple Crown and the Calcutta Cup.

Participants
The teams involved were:

Table

Results

External links

The official RBS Six Nations Site

Six Nations Championship seasons
Five Nations
Five Nations
Five Nations
Five Nations
Five Nations
Five Nations
Five Nations
Five Nations
Five Nations